Uch Tappeh-ye Kord (also Romanized as Ūch Tappeh-ye Kord) is a village in Marhemetabad Rural District, Central District, Miandoab County, West Azerbaijan Province, Iran. At the 2006 census, its population was 1,338, in 367 families.

References 

Populated places in Miandoab County